Diane L. Stone  (born April 1964) is an Australian-British academic.

Career
Diane Stone has been a founding vice president of the International Public Policy Association for 8 years until June 2022. She is Professor of Global Policy at the European University Institute in the School of Transnational Governance.  Until 2019, she worked at the University of Warwick for 23 years.

Diane Stone was Foundation Professor of Public Policy at Central European University (CEU) in Budapest in 2004, remaining as Visiting Professor from 2008.  She returned full time in 2019 to oversee the transition of the School of Public Policy to Vienna.

In 2012, she became a fellow of the Academy of the Social Sciences in Australia.  Professor Stone is also a Centenary Professor in the Institute for Governance and Policy Analysis  at the University of Canberra.

During 1999, Diane Stone worked at the World Bank Institute as a member of the Secretariat that launched the Global Development Network. She was an editor of Global Governance: A Review of Multilateralism and International Organizations.  Until 2020, she was Consulting Editor with Policy & Politics.

Research and publication has focused on the influence of ideas and expertise in policy making, and especially the impact of think tanks.  Other work has focused on policy networks. especially networks sponsored by the World Bank. Recent scholarship addresses the dynamics of global policy making and transnational administration as well as processes of policy translation.

At CEU, her research addressed international organisation influences on the transition countries of Central Europe.  She also researched international philanthropy in higher education, including that of the Open Society Foundations. 

At Warwick, research and publication addressed the new diplomacy in science, culture and diaspora. Stone was a research leader in the European Commission's EL-CSID consortium on European Leadership in Science Cultural and Innovation Diplomacy

Current work addresses the concept of 'epistocracy' and transnational governance.

Book Publications

 ‘Transnational Policy Transfer: Ideas, Power, and Development’, special issue guest edited with Leslie A. Pal and Osmany Porto de Oliveira, Policy & Society.  2020. 
Making Global Policy, Cambridge University Press, December 2019
 Oxford Handbook of Global Policy and Transnational Administration, with K. Moloney, Oxford University Press, 2019.
 Policy Experiments, Failures and Innovations: Beyond Accession in Central and Eastern Europe, with A. Batory and A. Cartwright, Edward Elgar, 2018.
 Knowledge Actors and Transnational Governance: The Public-Private Policy Nexus in the Global Agora Palgrave MacMillan, 2013.
 The World Bank and Governance: A Decade of Reform and Reaction, with C. Wright, Routledge, 2006. 
 Global Knowledge Networks and International Development: Bridges Across Boundaries, with S. Maxwell, Routledge, 2005
 Think Tank Traditions: Policy Research and the Politics of Ideas, with A. Denham (Manchester, Manchester University Press, 2004).
 Banking on Knowledge: The Genesis of the Global Development Network, London, Routledge, 2000. 
 Think Tanks Across Nations: A Comparative Approach (Manchester, Manchester University Press, 1998. 
 Capturing the Political Imagination: Think Tanks and the Policy Process, London: Frank Cass, 1996.

References

External links

Australian women academics
Australian academics
British women academics
Living people
1964 births
Academics of the University of Warwick
Academic staff of the University of Canberra
Academic staff of Central European University
Fellows of the Academy of the Social Sciences in Australia
Academic journal editors